West End Draught, commonly referred to as red tins, is a South Australian lager brewed by Lion, a subsidiary of Japanese company Kirin. It was formerly brewed by the South Australian Brewing Company on Port Road, Thebarton, which was taken over Lion in 1993. The company continued to trade as SA Brewing until 1 May 2019. Lion continues to use the name "West End Brewery" for its current brewery and website, which was the name of a former brewery on Hindley Street, taken over by SA Brewing in 1888.

West End Draught is a full-strength beer with an alcohol percentage of 4.5%. Other beers formerly brewed under the West End brand were West End Export, West End Gold, and West End Light, but these are no longer manufactured. "West End Bitter" was extensively shown and consumed in the 1971 Australian feature film Wake in Fright. West End are the original sponsors of the AFL "Showdown" and the "Slowdown" charity game in the Australian Football League (AFL).

The company is actively involved with the South Australian National Football League. In 1954, the annual tradition of painting the colours of the SANFL grand finalist teams on the brewery chimney began. The company also sponsors the West End State Team and the West End Country State Team; and cricket including the South Australian Cricket Association, the West End Redbacks, Adelaide Strikers; and Bowls South Australia.

In October 2020, Lion announced the closure of the Thebarton plant in June 2021, with production of West End Draught being transferred to breweries in Victoria.

See also

Beer in Australia
List of breweries in Australia
West End Brewery

External links

References 

Australian beer brands
1859 establishments in Australia
Food and drink companies established in 1859
South Australian Brewing Company
Kirin Group
Culture of South Australia